Mick Schumacher (born 22 March 1999) is a German racing driver who is the current reserve driver for the Mercedes AMG Formula One Team and McLaren. Schumacher competed in Formula One for Haas F1 Team in the 2021 and 2022 seasons.

Schumacher began his career in karting in 2008, progressing to the German ADAC Formula 4 by 2015. He is the son of seven-time Formula One World Champion Michael Schumacher, nephew of Ralf Schumacher and cousin of David Schumacher.

Personal life
Schumacher was born in Vufflens-le-Château, and grew up in Gland. He is the son of seven-time Formula One World Champion Michael Schumacher and Western riding European Champion Corinna Schumacher. His uncle Ralf Schumacher is also a retired racing driver and former Formula One driver. His cousin David Schumacher is a racing driver as well. Schumacher is named after five-time 500cc motorcycle World Champion Mick Doohan.

Schumacher was skiing with his father when Michael suffered life-threatening brain injuries on 29 December 2013. In March 2017, Mick first talked publicly about his father, describing him as "my idol" and "my role model".

Before the start of the 2017 Belgian Grand Prix, he drove his father's championship-winning Benetton B194. He drove another of his father's championship winning cars, the Ferrari F2004, in a demonstration before the 2020 Tuscan Grand Prix at Mugello, to mark Scuderia Ferrari's 1000th Formula One race, wearing his father's helmet for the occasion.

Schumacher credits chess as being an integral part of his mental preparation before a Formula One race. He stated: “I feel like these games kind of bring focus back, as you always have to be switched on with your mind. In a weekend, I always want to be mentally ready for every challenge that comes.”

Early career
Schumacher started his motorsport career in 2008. To avoid attention because of his famous father, he started his career under the pseudonym 'Mick Betsch', using his mother's maiden name.

Karting
In 2011 and 2012, Schumacher drove in the KF3 class of the ADAC Kart Masters, ending in 9th and 7th respectively. In the Euro Wintercup of the KF3 class, he was 3rd in 2011 and 2012 and in 2012 was 3rd in the KF3 Rating DMV Kart Championship. In 2013 he finished 3rd in the German Junior Kart Championship and the CIK-FIA Super Cup KF juniors. In 2014, Schumacher used the name 'Mick Junior', and started in International and National Junior Championships, ending the season 2nd in the German Junior Kart Championship as well as in the European and World Championships. Although he did not race in karting under his real surname, his successes in karting were picked up by the international press.

Formula 4

At the end of 2014, he completed test drives for Jenzer Motorsport in a Formula 4 racing car. In 2015, Schumacher started racing in formula classes for the first time, racing for Van Amersfoort Racing in the ADAC Formula 4, using the Schumacher name.
In 2016, Schumacher remained in ADAC Formula 4 but switched to Prema Powerteam, a team known for its close links to the Ferrari Driver Academy. He also entered the Italian F4 Championship and finished runner-up in both championships to Joey Mawson and Marcos Siebert respectively.

Formula 3
In November 2016, Schumacher made his first appearance in Formula 3 machinery by taking part in the MRF Challenge, a championship based in India. He competed in the upper Formula 2000 class and finished the series in 3rd place, collecting four wins, nine podiums, and two pole positions. Schumacher finished behind Harrison Newey and Joey Mawson, but ahead of his future Formula 3 and Formula 2 competitors Jüri Vips and Felipe Drugovich.

2017 

In April 2017, Schumacher made his debut in the FIA Formula 3 European Championship with Prema Powerteam. He finished the season in 12th place, his best finish being a 3rd place at Monza. Schumacher was the lowest finisher of the four Prema drivers, however, he was the third-best-placed rookie in the championship.

2018 
Schumacher continued driving for Prema in the 2018 championship. He suffered a slow start to the season, eventually taking his first win at the 15th race of the year at Spa-Francorchamps, almost halfway through the season. Before this race, he sat in 10th place in the championship, 67 points behind championship leader Dan Ticktum. However, Schumacher dominated the latter half of the season, taking seven more wins, including five consecutively. He ended the season as champion, 57 points clear of 2nd-placed Ticktum, taking eight wins, fourteen total podium finishes, seven pole positions, and four fastest laps.

FIA Formula 2

2019 

Schumacher moved up to the FIA Formula 2 Championship in 2019 with Prema Racing, alongside Sean Gelael. At the first round of the season in Bahrain, Schumacher started 10th and finished 8th after passing Nobuharu Matsushita on the final lap, giving him reverse-grid pole position for the sprint race, in which he finished sixth. Schumacher started from 7th in the feature race at Baku but was forced into retirement after a spin. He recovered from 19th to finish 5th in the sprint race. He failed to score points at Barcelona, suffering a collision in the first race and a time penalty for an illegal overtake on Jack Aitken in the second. At Monaco, Schumacher collided with multiple cars in the feature race, bringing out the red flag. He would fail to score points in either race. A double retirement came at the Circuit Paul Ricard, after he was involved in a collision with teammate Gelael in the first race and suffered a puncture in the second.

Schumacher stalled on the grid at the Red Bull Ring and finished in 18th place before a charge through the field in the sprint race saw him finish 4th. Another sprint race points-finish came at Silverstone with sixth place. He finished 8th at the feature race in Hungary, taking reverse-grid pole for the sprint race and holding the position to take his first win in Formula 2. Schumacher qualified sixth at Spa-Francorchamps, but both races were cancelled due to an accident that caused the death of Anthoine Hubert. At Monza, he retired from the feature race from a power issue but recovered to finish sixth in the sprint race, also achieving the fastest lap. He retired from both races in Russia, after an engine issue in the first and a collision with Giuliano Alesi in the second. Schumacher finished the season with 9th and 11th-place finishes in Abu Dhabi. He ended the season in 12th place in the championship with 53 points, considerably ahead of teammate Gelael, and took one win and one fastest lap.

2020 
Schumacher continued with Prema in the 2020 FIA Formula 2 Championship, joined by reigning FIA Formula 3 champion and fellow Ferrari Driver Academy member Robert Shwartzman. In the feature race at Austria, he went off while battling Callum Ilott for the race lead. In the second round at the same circuit, his fire extinguisher went off in the sprint race. In Hungary, Schumacher bounced back with a double podium. He then went on a run of 5 consecutive podiums from Spain to Monza, including a win in the Feature race at Monza, and took the Championship lead at Mugello. He won the feature race at the next round in Russia and came third in the sprint race which was shortened due to a crash between Luca Ghiotto and Jack Aitken.

At the Bahrain Round, he qualified in 10th and rose to fourth in the Feature race. He finished seventh in the Sprint race. As a result, Callum Ilott was able to bring the deficit down to 14 points going into the final round on the Outer Track at the same venue.

In Sakhir, Schumacher qualified a career-worst 18th following an incident with Roy Nissany. He produced a good recovery drive up to sixth with the fastest lap. This meant that the points gap stayed the same going into the final race. In the Sprint race, Schumacher flat-spotted his tyres while fighting for the lead, which led to him defending from Ilott for the first half of the race. After a few more lock-ups, he pitted for softs, dropping him out of the points. As a result of hard attacking and defending, Ilott's tires didn't fare much better and he too slowly fell out of the points. This result confirmed Schumacher as the 2020 FIA Formula 2 Champion.

Formula One
Schumacher joined the Ferrari Driver Academy in January 2019, citing Ferrari's ties with his family as a significant reason for joining. In April 2019, he made his debut behind the wheel of a modern Formula One car, piloting the Ferrari SF90 during the first day of in-season testing at Bahrain International Circuit. He completed 56 laps during the test. He commented that being with Ferrari "felt like home" and that he was impressed by the braking power of the SF90. He continued in-season testing for Alfa Romeo Racing the following day.

Schumacher was due to make his Formula One practice debut at the 2020 Eifel Grand Prix in the first practice session, driving for Alfa Romeo in place of Antonio Giovinazzi. Due to bad weather conditions, the session was cancelled and he performed no running. Schumacher instead made his practice debut at the 2020 Abu Dhabi Grand Prix, driving for Haas in place of Kevin Magnussen. He later made an appearance for Haas at the post-season young drivers' test.

Ahead of the 2021 season, Schumacher requested to use the ‘MSC’ abbreviation for his name, shown on TV coverage. MSC was the abbreviation used by his father Michael, to distinguish between Michael and his brother Ralf, whose time in Formula One coincided. Schumacher had previously raced under the ‘SCH’ abbreviation in Formula 2.

Haas (2021–2022)

2021 season 

Schumacher drove for the Haas team in  after signing a multi-year contract, alongside Nikita Mazepin, with whom he raced in go-karts. He chose to race with the number 47 as his two favourite numbers, 4 and 7, were already in use by Lando Norris and Kimi Räikkönen respectively.

He spun on the first lap but was able to continue, eventually finishing last of the remaining drivers in sixteenth place. He performed one of the only on-track overtakes of the Grand Prix, passing Mazepin at the Grand Hotel Hairpin on the opening lap.

He avoided the collisions on the opening lap and was classified twelfth in the race, later commenting that he was proud of his performance after having on-track battles with Max Verstappen. He and Fernando Alonso collided on the opening lap, causing Schumacher to spin and eventually finish nineteenth. Alonso later apologised for his role in the incident. He started the  fourteenth on the grid but was eliminated at the first corner after a collision with Esteban Ocon.

Schumacher ended his debut season nineteenth in the drivers' championship, ahead of teammate Mazepin but with no points scored. He continued testing for Ferrari during the season, completing test sessions in the SF71H at Fiorano Circuit.

2022 season 

Schumacher remained with Haas for the  season, partnering Kevin Magnussen. He also served as a reserve driver for Ferrari during the season, sharing duties with Antonio Giovinazzi.

Schumacher qualified twelfth and finished eleventh at the season opening Bahrain Grand Prix, gaining positions due to the retirements of both Red Bulls and Pierre Gasly and achieving his best Formula One race result thus far. Schumacher missed the Saudi Arabian Grand Prix after a high-impact crash in qualifying. He was transferred to hospital for precautionary checks and was released with no injuries. He made his racing return for the Australian Grand Prix, starting fifteenth and finishing thirteenth. Schumacher was running in the top ten with three laps remaining of the Miami Grand Prix, but collided with Sebastian Vettel during an overtake attempt and dropped to fifteenth. He reached the third qualifying session (Q3) for the first time in Formula One at the  but finished the race outside the points. He had a heavy crash that split his car in half at the Monaco Grand Prix, causing the race to be red-flagged. 

He was running in seventh place until an engine failure ended his race. At the following race, the British Grand Prix, he started nineteenth and recovered to eighth to score his first Formula One points. He reached Q3 again at the  but finished outside the points. Ahead of the season-ending , Haas announced that they would part ways with Schumacher following the 2022 season. He is set to be replaced by Nico Hülkenberg.

Mercedes and McLaren reserve driver (2023–) 
In December 2022, Ferrari announced that they would be ending their collaboration with Schumacher after four years, Schumacher having joined the driver academy back in 2019. 

The same day Mercedes-AMG F1 officially confirmed Schumacher will take on the role of reserve driver for 2023, following his departure from Haas and having been released from Ferrari's Young Driver Academy. Team principal Toto Wolff said: “Mick is a talented young driver and we’re delighted to have him join the team. He is a hard worker, has a calm and methodical approach and is still hungry to learn and improve as a driver. These are all important qualities, and we’re excited for him to help us develop the W14. [...] We also know that with two years of experience racing in Formula 1 under his belt, he will be ready to step into the car at short notice to replace either Lewis [Hamilton] or George [Russell], should that need arise." Further, he became a reserve driver (alongside Álex Palou) for McLaren, who have an agreement with Mercedes as a result of their engine contract to share Mercedes' reserves, meaning he would also be available in 2023 to substitute for Lando Norris or Oscar Piastri if required.

Karting record

Karting career summary

Racing record

Racing career summary

Complete ADAC Formula 4 Championship results 
(key) (Races in bold indicate pole position) (Races in italics indicate fastest lap)

Complete MRF Challenge Formula 2000 Championship results 
(key) (Races in bold indicate pole position; races in italics indicate fastest lap)

Complete Italian Formula 4 Championship results 
(key) (Races in bold indicate pole position) (Races in italics indicate fastest lap)

Complete FIA Formula 3 European Championship results
(key) (Races in bold indicate pole position) (Races in italics indicate fastest lap)

‡ Half points were awarded as less than 75% of race distance was completed.

Complete Macau Grand Prix results

Complete FIA Formula 2 Championship results
(key) (Races in bold indicate pole position) (Races in italics indicate points for the fastest lap of top ten finishers)

‡ Half points were awarded as less than 75% of race distance was completed.

Complete Formula One results
(key) (Races in bold indicate pole position) (Races in italics indicate fastest lap)

Notes

References

External links
  
 

1999 births
Living people
ADAC Formula 4 drivers
Citizens of Germany through descent
German expatriate sportspeople in Switzerland
German racing drivers
Italian F4 Championship drivers
FIA Formula 3 European Championship drivers
Karting World Championship drivers
MRF Challenge Formula 2000 Championship drivers
FIA Formula 2 Championship drivers
Haas Formula One drivers
German Formula One drivers
Mick
Van Amersfoort Racing drivers
Prema Powerteam drivers
FIA Formula 2 Champions